Shahrak-e Enqelab may refer to:

Shahrak-e Enqelab, Khuzestan
Shahrak-e Enqelab, Tehran